The Lincoln Versailles is a mid-size luxury car that was marketed by Lincoln from the 1977 to 1980 model years.  The first Lincoln introduced outside of the full-size segment, the Versailles is a rebranded version of the Ford Granada and Mercury Monarch.  Replacing the Mercury Grand Monarch Ghia, the model line was introduced as a competitor to the Cadillac Seville.  

Deriving its nameplate from the French palace outside Paris, the Lincoln Versailles was offered solely as a four-door sedan; it is the final vehicle developed from the chassis architecture of the American Ford Falcon.

From 1977 to 1980, Ford produced the Lincoln Versailles alongside the Granada and Monarch at Wayne Stamping & Assembly (Wayne, Michigan) and Mahwah Assembly (Mahwah, New Jersey).  In total, 50,156 examples were produced.

Origin of name 
During the mid-1950s, a Ford Versailles was manufactured by Simca in France, derived from the Ford Vedette.

In 1966, during the development of what would become the Continental Mark III, Ford researched the suitability of multiple nameplates for the model line with potential consumers.  The Versailles name placed third (after Mark VI and LeMarque) among a large group of nameplates.  Though Ford ultimately sought to restart the chronology of the Mark series with Mark III, the company held onto the name, keeping it for the 1977 Lincoln Versailles.

Background 
During the mid-1970s, the Lincoln division of Ford sought to expand its model range for multiple reasons.  Though sales of large luxury cars would ultimately recover in the aftermath of the 1973 oil crisis, in the United States, the rise of imported cars also led to transition in the luxury-vehicle segment.  While competing with Cadillac, Imperial, and Lincoln in terms of price, the West German BMW 3.0Si and Mercedes-Benz 350SE/450SE and the British Jaguar XJ offered American luxury car customers a far different vehicle than produced by Ford, GM, or Chrysler.

In 1973, the Lincoln Mark I Ghia concept car was developed by Ghia, derived from the Ford Granada Mk I.

For 1976, the Cadillac Seville was introduced in May 1975. Developed by GM (in only 16 months) in response to both the fuel crises and in effort to match European luxury sedans, the Seville sourced its V8 engine from Oldsmobile and its chassis underpinnings from the Chevrolet Nova. The smallest Cadillac in 40 years, the Seville broke a long-running industry precedent, as the near-compact model Cadillac was its most expensive (non-limousine) sedan.

Coinciding with the launch of the Seville, Ford began development of a Lincoln-branded competitor to the model line, tasked with bringing the model line to market for the 1977 model year. Adopting the Lincoln Versailles name, Ford used the body architecture of the Ford Granada/Mercury Monarch compact sedans, introduced for 1975. Sized closely against the GM X-body compacts, the Granada/Monarch were developed to replace the Ford Maverick/Mercury Comet.  With little over than a year until its product launch, the Versailles was relegated to become a variant of a production vehicle, sharing a large degree of its body panels with its Mercury counterpart.  To further streamline development, the Versailles adopted the design features of the highest-trim Mercury Grand Monarch Ghia (which was discontinued for 1977).

In line with the Seville, the Versailles was the most expensive Lincoln sedan at $11,500 ($ in  dollars ); Lincoln-Mercury priced the model line $2000 under the Seville, keeping the model line below the Continental Mark V in price. The first Lincoln manufactured outside of Wixom Assembly since 1957, the Versailles was produced alongside the Mercury Monarch and Ford Granada.  The model was notable for being the first production vehicle to be sold with clearcoat paint and halogen headlights in North America.

Overview 
The Lincoln Versailles marked the first time since 1960 that Lincoln offered two sedan lines. Nearly three feet shorter than the Continental, the model line was offered only as a four-door sedan.

Exterior 

Offered only as a four-door sedan, the Versailles shared many visible body panels with the Monarch and Granada, including the entire roofline.  Several design elements were revised, giving the Versailles an appearance closer in line to the Continental and Mark V, including a "Continental spare" decklid (with LINCOLN lettering) and model-specific taillamps; the Versailles (the first Lincoln with exposed headlamps since 1969) introduced rectangular headlamps to the brand.

For 1979, the model line received a revised roofline, distinct from the Granada/Monarch.  Developed by American Sunroof Company, a fiberglass cap on the rear roof and reshaped rear doors gave the model line a notchback appearance (a vinyl landau roof was now standard).

Interior 
Essentially taking over the role of the Mercury Grand Monarch Ghia, the Lincoln Versailles inherited many standard interior features, including many seen in the larger Mercury Grand Marquis and Lincoln Continental. Along with power-operated leather-trim seats and steering wheel, power steering and windows, the Versailles included features such as a digital LCD clock, dual map lights, lighted passenger vanity mirror, rear-seat map pockets, and plush carpeting with soundproofing.

Chassis 
The Versailles shares its wheelbase with the Ford Granada/Mercury Monarch and the four-door Ford Maverick/Mercury Comet.  Marketed as a compact car, the Versailles is closer in size to the mid-size segment of today, in terms of exterior footprint.

According to Lincoln advertising, a quality-control regimen was used at the factory. According to the marketing, final assembly included dynamometer testing of the engine/transmission, a water spray test to pinpoint body leaks, and a simulated road test. The Versailles featured "matched and balanced" driveline elements, low-friction lower ball joints, double isolated shocks, reinforced chassis areas, sound insulation, and balanced forged 14-inch aluminum wheels with Michelin whitewall X-radials. Bodywork received the first clear-coat paint on a regular production car.”

The Versailles shared its powertrain with the Monarch upon which it was based, with a V8 engine as a sole choice. Initially, the Versailles was powered by the 351 cubic-inch V8, phased out in favor of the 302 cubic-inch V8. The three-speed C4 automatic transmission was the only transmission available. The rear differential used in the Versailles was Ford 9-inch with rear disc brakes, replacing the drums used on the Granada and the Monarch.

Sales 
In comparison to the Cadillac Seville, the Lincoln Versailles fared poorly, outsold by the Cadillac by a three to one margin in its 1977 debut year.  Following its update for the 1979 model year, sales of the Versailles would more than double, though remaining far behind its Cadillac counterpart.

In its entire production run, Lincoln would sell 50,156 examples of the Versailles.  By comparison, Cadillac would outsell that total in both 1978 and 1979, the last two years of the first-generation Seville.

References

External links

 Versailles enthusiast site
 American Granada, Monarch & Versailles Registry & Forums

Versailles
Mid-size cars
Rear-wheel-drive vehicles
1980s cars
Cars introduced in 1977
Luxury vehicles
Vehicles discontinued in 1980